Jacques Abel Jules Revaud (born 11 July 1940), known as Jacques Revaux, is a French songwriter, most famous for his 1968 writing collaboration with singer Claude François on the song "Comme d'habitude", whose text was reworked by Canadian singer-songwriter Paul Anka into the English language as "My Way", which was in turn a hit first recorded by Frank Sinatra. He co-founded Trema Records with Regis Talar. Revaux also wrote many hit songs for another French singing star, Michel Sardou.

References

External links
 

1940 births
Living people
People from Indre-et-Loire
French songwriters
Male songwriters